Nelson Province was an electorate of the Victorian Legislative Council (Australia). It was created in the wide-scale redistribution of Provinces 1882 when Central and Eastern Provinces were abolished and ten new Provinces were created.
Its area included Camperdown, Ararat and Mortlake.

Nelson was created and defined by the Legislative Council Act 1881 (taking effect from the 1882 elections) as consisting of the following divisions: Hampden, Mortlake, Ararat Shire, Ararat Borough, Ripon, Grenville, Ballaarat, Lexton, Avoca, Stawell Shire and Stawell Borough.

Nelson was later refined in 1904 as consisting of: Ararat, Beaufort, Carisbrook (boroughs of Carisbrook and Majorca), Clunes, Creswick, Dunolly (boroughs of Dunolly and Tarnagulla and the shire of Bet Bet), Glenorchy (shire of Stawell), Landsborough (shire of Avoca), Lexton, Maryborough, Moyston (shire of Ararat), St. Arnaud, Stawell, Stuart Mill (shire of Kara Kara), Talbot and Timor (shire of Tullaroop and the portion of the shire of Maldon within the province).

Nelson Province was finally abolished in 1940 in the wake of another redistribution of Provinces in 1937 when four new Provinces were created. Nelson, Wellington and Melbourne East Provinces were all abolished in the years 1937 to 1940.

Members for Nelson Province
Three members initially, two after the redistribution of 1904. The first three members, Thomas Bromell, Charles Sladen and James Williamson were all "Assigned from original Western Province", Williamson was elected in place of the retiring Robert Simson.

References

Former electoral provinces of Victoria (Australia)
1882 establishments in Australia
1940 disestablishments in Australia